Moser's Rides (formerly Soriani and Moser) is an Italian amusement ride manufacturer based in Ostiglia. Their most notable ride is the defunct Mäch Tower in Busch Gardens Williamsburg in  James City County, Virginia.

History
Moser's Rides was founded in 1997 in Melara (in the Rovigo Province/Veneto Region) by Alfeo Moser and his 3 sons Stefano Moser, Mattia Moser, Sebastiano Moser from former Soriani & Moser. Then moved to Ostiglia (in Mantova Province/Lombardy Region) in 1998. As of July 2018, the company production list includes 20 thrill rides and 17 fun rides.

Notable attractions

References

External links
 http://moserrides.com
http://attractionsindustrymarketplace.com/Listing/Company/Rides/Manufacturer's_Representative/1346173
http://intermarkridegroup.com/moser-rides

Italian companies established in 1969
Manufacturing companies established in 1969
Amusement ride manufacturers
Manufacturing companies of Italy